Antoine Christopher A. F. Cassar (born 1978 in London) is a Maltese poet and translator. In September 2009, his multilingual poem Merħba was the Grand Prize winner of the United Planet Writing Contest.

Personal life 
Cassar was born in London to Maltese parents. He lived in Spain, Italy, and Luxembourg.

Works 
Cassar's work deals with themes of language, maps and borders. 

Passport (2009) is a poem published in a mock-passport form addressing themes of migration and nationhood. It was translated into nine languages, with proceeds donated to refugee charities around the world.

Mosaics poems
Cassar's mużajki or mosaics poems combine a minimum of five languages, mainly English, French, Italian, Maltese and Spanish, often in the form of a Petrarchan sonnet. These poems, the first series of which was published in July 2007 in the anthology Ħbula Stirati (Tightropes), engage in the braiding of words and sounds in the different languages used whilst maintaining a coherent rhythm and logical poetic sequence. Among the main themes explored by the mosaics are the vanity and futility of life, love unrequited or fulfilled, the absurdity of colonialism and its after-effects, and the at once exhilarating and disorienting feeling of variety itself. The following is a stanza from his sonnet C'est la vie

As Marija Grech explains, "...the deeper significance of these poems may be said to lie not simply in the more traditional meaning of the individual words or verses, but more specifically in the play with sound that the movement from one language to another generates and exploits. As the poet explains, 'the mosaics are designed not so much to be read but to be heard'." Cassar, on an interview, describes the meaning of the "multiple levels" on his poetry: "How often does one read or listen to a poem and understand it completely? In my reading experience, I find that if a poem offers all its connotation, undertones and beauty at one go, its taste will soon be forgotten... The multiple levels of a poem should pique and stir the readers' curiosity, slowly but surely bringing them deeper into the text."

See also
 Modern Macaronic literature
  Poesia multilingue

References

External links
 Performance at the XIII Biennale des Jeunes Créateurs de l'Europe et de la Mediterranée, 28 May 2008
 The Malta Council Culture and the Arts, 2008
 Cassar on proz.com

1978 births
Living people
21st-century Maltese poets
Maltese male poets
Maltese translators
English-language writers from Malta
French-language writers from Malta
Italian-language writers from Malta
Spanish-language writers from Malta
Spanish–English translators
Italian–English translators
French–English translators
English–Spanish translators
Maltese–Spanish translators